was a Japanese actress who was active primarily in the 1950s.

Early life and education
Kyō, an only child, was born  in Osaka in 1924. Her father left when she was five years old, and she was raised by her mother and grandmother. She adopted Machiko Kyō as her stage name when she entered the Osaka Shochiku Kagekidan in 1936 at age 12. She trained as a revue dancer before entering the film industry through Daiei Film in 1949. Two years later, she achieved international fame as the female lead in Akira Kurosawa's film Rashomon, which won first prize at the Venice Film Festival and stunned audiences with its nonlinear narrative.

Career
Kyō starred in many more Japanese productions, including Kenji Mizoguchi's Ugetsu (1953), Teinosuke Kinugasa's Gate of Hell (1953), Kon Ichikawa's Odd Obsession (1959), and Yasujirō Ozu's Floating Weeds (1959).

Her sole role in a non-Japanese film was as Lotus Blossom, the young geisha in The Teahouse of the August Moon (1956) opposite Marlon Brando and Glenn Ford, for which she received a Golden Globe nomination.

Kyō continued to act through her 80s. Her final role was as Matsuura Shino in the NHK television drama series Haregi Koko Ichiban in 2000. In 2017, she was presented with an award of merit at the 40th Japanese Academy Awards. After retiring from film, she moved back to Osaka, where she resided until her death.

Personal life
Kyō never married, although her romantic relationship with Daiei Film's president Masaichi Nagata was well-publicized in Japan.

Kyō died from heart failure on May 12, 2019.  She was 95.

Selected filmography

Films

 Hana kurabe tanuki-goten (1949) - Aiai, witch
 Chijin no ai (1949) - Naomi
 Harukanari haha no kuni (1950) - Mari, daughter
 Fukkatsu (1950) - Yukiko Ohara
 Rashomon (1950) - Masako Kanazawa
 Hi no tori (1950)
 Itsuwareru seiso (1950) - Kimicho
 Koi no Oranda-zaka (1951) - Chigusa
 Jiyû gakkô (1951) - Yuri
 Joen no hatoba (1951)
 Mesu inu (1951) - Emmy
 Genji monogatari (1951) - Awaji no ue
 Bakurô ichidai (1951) - Yuki
 Asakusa kurenaidan (1952) - Ryûko Beni
 Daibutsu kaigen (1952) - Mayame
 Nagasaki No Uta Wa Wasureji (1952) - Okumura, Ayako
 Taki no Shiraito (1952) - Taki no Shiraito
 Bijo to touzoku (1952) - Sakin
 Kanojo no tokudane (1952)
 Ugetsu (1953) - Lady Wakasa
 Older Brother, Younger Sister (1953) - Mon
 Gate of Hell (1953) - Kesa
 Aru onna (1954) - Yoko Hayazuki
 Shunkin monogatari (1954) - Shunkin
 Asakusa no yoru (1954) - Setsuko Takashima
 The Princess Sen (1954) - the princess Sen
 Bazoku geisha (1954) - Nobukichi
 A Girl Isn't Allowed to Love (1955) - Sachiko Nonomiya
 Princess Yang Kwei-Fei (1955) - Princess Yang Kwei-fei
 Tōjūrō no Koi (1955) - Okaji
 Shin, Heike monogatari: Yoshinaka o meguru sannin no onna (1956) - Tomoe
 Niji ikutabi (1956) - Momoko Mizuhara
 Street of Shame (1956) - Mickey
 Tsukigata Hanpeita: Hana no maki; Arashi no maki (1956) - Hagino
 The Teahouse of the August Moon (1956) - Lotus Blossom
 Itohan monogatari (1957) - Okatsu
 Odoriko (1957) - Chiyomi Hanamura
 Jigoku bana (1957) - Sute
 Yoru no chô (1957) - Mari
 The Hole (1957) - Nagako Kita
 Yūrakuchō de Aimashō (1958) - Aya Koyanagi
 Sorrow Is Only for Women (1958) - Michiko
 The Loyal 47 Ronin (1958) - Orui (spy)
 Haha (1958) - Takako Ômachi
 Ôsaka no onna (1958) - Osen
 Akasen no hi wa kiezu (1958) - Nobuko Araki
 Yoru no sugao (1958) - Akemi
 Satsujin to kenjû (1958)
 Musume no boken (1958)
 Anata to watashi no aikotoba: Sayônara, konnichiwa (1959) - Umeko Ichige
 Sasameyuki (1959) - Sachiko
 Onna to Kaizoku (1959) - Ayaginu / Oito
 Yoru no togyo (1959) - Ryoko Kashiwabara
 Jirôchô Fuji (1959) - Okatsu
 Odd Obsession (1959) - Ikuko / Wife
 Floating Weeds (1959) - Sumiko
 Jokyo (1960) - Omitsu
 Ruten no ôhi (1960) - Ryûko Korinkakura (Hiroko Aishinkakura)
 Bonchi (1960) - Ofuku
 San'nin no kaoyaku (1960) - Chizuru
 Ashi ni sawatta onna (1960) - Saya Shiozawa
 Oden jigoku (1960) - Oden Takahashi
 Konki (1961) - Shizu, Takuo's wife
 Nuregami botan (1961) - Kiyomigata no Omon
 Onna no kunshô (1961) - Shikiko Ohba
 Kodachi o tsukau onna (1961) - Ritsu Ikeda
 Buda (1961) - Nandabala
 Black Lizard (1962) - Mrs. Midorikawa
 Shin no shikôtei (1962) 
 Onna no issho (1962) - Kei
 Budda (1962)
 Nyokei kazoku (1963) - Fujiyo Yajima
 Sweet Sweat (1964) - Umeko
 Gendai inchiki monogatari: Dotanuki (1964)
 The Face of Another (1966) - Mrs. Okuyama
 Jinchoge (1966) - Kikuko, Ueno, 1st Daughter
 Chiisai tôbôsha (1966) - Yayoi Yamamura
 Senba zuru (1969) - Chikako Kurimoto
 Genkai yûkyôden: Yabure kabure (1970) - Sue Yoshida
 Karei-naru Ichizoku (1974) - Aiko Takasu
 Kinkanshoku (1955) - Prime Minister's wife
 Kenji Mizoguchi: The Life of a Film Director (1975, documentary) - Herself
 Yoba (1976) - Oshima
 Tora's Pure Love (1976) - Aya Yagyû
 Kesho (1984) - Tsune Tsutano

Television
 Hissatsu Shimainin (1981)
 Shin Hissatsu Shimainin (1982)
 Hissatsu Shikirinin (1984)
 Hana no Ran (1994) - Hino Shigeko
 Genroku Ryōran (1999) - Keishō'in

Honors
Medal with Purple Ribbon (1987)
Order of the Precious Crown, 4th Class, Wisteria (1994)

Gallery

References

External links

 Photo gallery: Machiko Kyo in Japanese Film-fan Magazines of the 1950s

1924 births
2019 deaths
Japanese film actresses
Japanese stage actresses
People from Osaka
20th-century Japanese actresses
Recipients of the Medal with Purple Ribbon